Chaoyang Men Station is an interchange station on Line 2 and Line 6 of the Beijing Subway named for Chaoyangmen, an old gate in Beijing's city wall.

Station layout 
Both the line 2 and 6 stations have underground island platforms.

Exits 
There are 5 exits, lettered A, E, F, G, and H. Exits A and H are accessible.

Gallery

Around the station
 Nandouya Mosque

References

External links
 

Railway stations in China opened in 1984
Beijing Subway stations in Dongcheng District
Beijing Subway stations in Chaoyang District